Myrtis Dightman (born 1935) is an American former professional rodeo cowboy who specialized in bull riding. He is a ProRodeo Hall of Fame inductee. Known as the "Jackie Robinson of Rodeo", Dightman was the first African-American to compete at the National Finals Rodeo.

Early life
Dightman was born in 1935 on a 4,000-acre ranch in Houston County near Crockett, Texas. His father worked for rancher Karl Leediker. mrytis liked to play outside and help his father .

Career 
Dightman started his career in rodeo in Houston. In 1964, he became the first black cowboy to compete at the National Finals Rodeo (NFR).  He qualified for the NFR in 1966, 1967, 1968, 1969, 1970, and 1972. In 1967, he had the best year-end finish of his career by placing third in the Professional Rodeo Cowboys Association (PRCA) World Standings. The PRCA was formerly known as the Rodeo Cowboys Association (RCA). In 1971, he won both the Calgary Stampede and Cheyenne Frontier Days.

Dightman was hired to do stunts and play as himself in the rodeo movies J.W. Coop and Sam Peckinpah's Junior Bonner in 1971.

Dightman was a big influence on Charles Sampson. In October 2006 a benefit concert featuring Michael Martin Murphey and Don Edwards was held to raise funds for a bronze statue in his honor.  It was placed at the entrance of the Porth Ag Arena in Crockett, Texas. This rodeo arena hosts the annual Labor Day Rodeo that bears his name.

Honors 
 1970 Calgary Stampede Guy Weadick Award
 1997 Rodeo Hall of Fame of the National Cowboy and Western Heritage Museum
 2001 Texas Rodeo Cowboy Hall of Fame
 2003 National Multicultural Western Heritage Museum
 2003 PBR Ring of Honor
 2011 Texas Cowboy Hall of Fame
 2016 ProRodeo Hall of Fame
 2016 Bull Riding Hall of Fame

References

External links
 Bull rider paved way for blacks in rodeo arena
  Maxine Session. Myrtis Dightman, SR. the man behind the Crockett, Texas Rodeo and Trail Ride. Texas Informer
 Myrtis Dightman Filmography

Living people
1935 births
People from Crockett, Texas
African-American sportsmen
Sportspeople from Texas
Bull riders
ProRodeo Hall of Fame inductees
Professional Bull Riders: Heroes and Legends
21st-century African-American people
20th-century African-American sportspeople